Aurel Vlaicu High School may refer to several schools in Romania:

Aurel Vlaicu National College, Bucharest 
Aurel Vlaicu High School (Breaza)
Aurel Vlaicu High School (Orăștie)
Aurel Vlaicu Technical High School (Arad)
Aurel Vlaicu Technical High School (Baia Mare)
Aurel Vlaicu Technical High School (Cluj-Napoca)
Aurel Vlaicu Technical High School (Lugoj)